The Municipality of Newtown was a local government area of Sydney, New South Wales, Australia. The municipality was proclaimed as a borough in 1862 and, with an area of 1.9 square kilometres, was centred on the suburb of Newtown, including parts of Erskineville and Enmore. The municipality was divided into four wards: Kingston, Enmore, O'Connell and Camden. In 1949 under the Local Government (Areas) Act 1948, Newtown Municipal Council was merged with the larger neighbouring City of Sydney which was located immediately to the North, although parts were subsequently, from 1968, moved into Marrickville Council. Mayors included Lilian Fowler (1938–1939), the first female mayor in Australia.

Council history
On 12 December 1862 the Municipality of Newtown was incorporated and divided into three wards: O'Connell, Kingston and Enmore (a fourth, Camden Ward, was added later) covering . In 1893 a plan was discussed to rename the council area 'South Sydney' (as three municipalities in the north of Sydney Harbour had merged to form North Sydney three years earlier), but nothing came of it. Under the enactment of The Municipalities Act of 1867, the title of 'Chairman' for the council was changed to be 'Mayor'. With this Act, the council also became known as the Borough of Newtown. From 28 December 1906, with the passing of the Local Government Act, 1906, the council was again renamed as the "Municipality of Newtown".

By the end of the Second World War, the NSW Government had realised that its ideas of infrastructure expansion could not be effected by the present system of the patchwork of small municipal councils across Sydney and the Minister for Local Government, Joseph Cahill, following the recommendations of the 1945–46 Clancy Royal Commission on Local Government Boundaries, passed a bill in 1948 that abolished a significant number of those councils. Under the Local Government (Areas) Act 1948, Newtown Municipal Council became the Newtown Ward of the City of Sydney, returning four aldermen.

Mayors

References

Mayors
Newtown
Newtown, New South Wales